Shobeysheh may refer to:
 Shobeysheh, Ahvaz
 Shobeysheh, Shadegan